Events from the year 1865 in Ireland.

Events
23 July – the  sets out from Valentia Island on the first attempt to lay the transatlantic telegraph cable.
Work begins on the building of the Albert Memorial Clock, Belfast, as a memorial to Queen Victoria's late Prince Consort, Prince Albert.

Arts and literature
9 May – International Exhibition of Arts and Manufactures opens in Dublin.
23 December – Gustavus Vaughan Brooke concludes a farewell season in Belfast, playing the title role in Richard III.
Augustus Burke paints Connemara Girl.
Samuel Ferguson publishes his collected poems Lays of the Western Gael.

Deaths
6 February – Andrew Claude de la Cherois Crommelin, astronomer (died 1939).
16 March – Patsy Donovan, Major League Baseball player and manager (died 1953 in the United States).
17 March – Patrick Joseph Sullivan, mayor of Casper, Wyoming and Republican member of the United States Senate from Wyoming (died 1935 in the United States).
20 April – James Macmahon, civil servant and businessman, Under-Secretary for Ireland from 1918 to 1922 (died 1954).
4 May – Charles A. Callis, member of the Quorum of the Twelve Apostles of the Church of Jesus Christ of Latter-day Saints (died 1947 in the United States).
7 May – John MacBride, nationalist rebel and Easter Rising leader (executed 1916).
8 May – Charles FitzClarence, soldier, recipient of the Victoria Cross for gallantry in 1899 near Mafeking, South Africa (killed in action 1914).
10 June – Dermod O'Brien, painter (died 1945).
13 June – William Butler Yeats, poet and dramatist (died 1939).
18 June – Henry Allan, painter (died 1912).
24 June – Harry Plunket Greene, baritone (died 1936).
15 July – Alfred Harmsworth, 1st Viscount Northcliffe, newspaper and publishing magnate (died 1922)
16 July – 'George A. Birmingham' (Rev. James Owen Hannay), novelist (died 1950)
29 August – Thomas Kent, nationalist rebel (executed following a gunfight with the RIC 1916).
4 September – Alice Milligan, nationalist and poet (died 1953).
16 October – Rudolph Lambart, 10th Earl of Cavan, British Army commander in World War I, later Chief of the Imperial General Staff and Field Marshal (died 1946).
12 November – Herbert Trench, poet (died 1923).
Full date unknown
Grace Rhys, née Little, novelist (died 1929).
Robert Henry Woods, Irish Unionist MP (died 1938).

Births
1 April – John Cuffe, 3rd Earl of Desart, Conservative politician. (born 1818).
23 May – Benjamin Holmes, businessman and politician in Quebec (born 1794).
25 July – Dr James Barry, military surgeon, revealed on death to be a woman, probably Margaret Ann Bulkley (born 1789-1799).
31 August – John Farrell, soldier and recipient of the Victoria Cross for gallantry at the 1854 Charge of the Light Brigade (born 1826).
2 September – William Rowan Hamilton, mathematician, physicist, and astronomer (born 1805).
Full date unknown
Jones Quain, anatomist (born 1796).

References

 
1860s in Ireland
Years of the 19th century in Ireland
Ireland
 Ireland